St Andrew's Square can mean:
 St Andrew's Square, Glasgow
 St Andrew's Square, Kingston upon Thames, a garden square in London
 St Andrew Square, Edinburgh